Murray Evan Sainsbury (born 14 September 1940) is a former Australian politician. He was a member of the House of Representatives from 1975 to 1983, representing the Division of Eden-Monaro as a member of the Liberal Party. He was a civil engineer before entering politics.

Early life
Sainsbury was born in Wollongong, New South Wales. He graduated from the University of Sydney with the degrees of Bachelor of Engineering and Bachelor of Economics. He was a qualified civil engineer and operated his own building and construction company.

Politics
Sainsbury was elected to federal parliament in the Coalition's landslide victory at the 1975 federal election, defeating the incumbent Labor MP Bob Whan. He was re-elected in 1977 and 1980, defeated by Labor's Jim Snow in 1983 and failed in an attempt to regain the seat in 1984.

According to Paul Kelly, Sainsbury was part of "the vanguard of the free market lobby within the Liberal Party" along with three other backbenchers (Jim Carlton, John Hyde, and Peter Shack). He briefly served as a deputy government whip from September to December 1981.

In 1982, Sainsbury approached local artist Tom Thompson to depict proceedings of the House of Representatives. Thompson's sketches have been cited as "the first and only occasion that an artist has been permitted to draw in the house", and are now held by the Museum of Australian Democracy.

Later career
In 1991, Sainsbury was appointed CEO of a project management company within the Hindmarsh Group. He had previously worked with the group as a consultant for two years.

As of 2014, Sainsbury was the president of the Association of Former Members of the Parliament of Australia. In a submission to a parliamentary committee on behalf of the organisation, he argued against the abolition of the Life Gold Pass Scheme, which provided former MPs and senators with 10 free return airfares within Australia each year.

References

1940 births
Living people
Liberal Party of Australia members of the Parliament of Australia
Members of the Australian House of Representatives
Members of the Australian House of Representatives for Eden-Monaro
20th-century Australian politicians
People from Wollongong
Australian civil engineers